Macmillan Academy is an academy in Middlesbrough, North Yorkshire, England.
The school was founded in 1989 as the Macmillan City Technology College, one of the first of 15 City Technology Colleges established in England. Its initial sponsors were the Macmillan Trust, a charity run by Macmillan Publishers,
The school converted to academy status in 2006.
An Ofsted inspection in 2007 rated the school as outstanding. As of 2020, its most recent full inspection was in 2013, when it was judged Good.

History
The school opened in 1989 as Macmillan City Technology College along with the current buildings (now English and Mathematics). It later became Macmillan College. The current reception and dining hall were opened in the early 2000s and the school converted to academy status in 2006, along with a new building housing Science, Music and Physical Education.

Notable alumni
Steph McGovern – TV presenter
Jacob Young –  Conservative MP for Redcar
Sam Gowland – TV personality
Lewis Boyce – Rugby union player

References 

Academies in Middlesbrough
Educational institutions established in 1989
Former city technology colleges
1989 establishments in England
Secondary schools in Middlesbrough